The Men's 1,500 m Freestyle event at the 2006 Central American and Caribbean Games took place on Wednesday, July 19, 2006, at the S.U. Pedro de Heredia Aquatic Complex in Cartagena, Colombia. This was a timed-final event, meaning that the swimmers only swam the race once, and whatever time they obtained was used to rank them in the final rankings.

Records

Results

References

Men's 1500 Free results from the official website of the 2006 Central American and Caribbean Games; retrieved 2009-06-29.

Freestyle, Men's 1500m